"Little Bunny Foo Foo" is a children's poem and song. The poem consists of four-line sung verses separated by some spoken words. The verses are sung to the tune of the French-Canadian children's song "Alouette" (1879), which is melodically similar to "Down by the Station" (1948) and the "Itsy Bitsy Spider". The person performing the song usually includes hand gestures, e.g. for "scooping" and "bopping".

The song has many different variations and is often passed on as childlore. Beverly Cleary's 1970 children's book Runaway Ralph mentions "Little Rabbit Fru-Fru" as a song heard at summer camp, and a 1970 issue of The New Yorker acknowledges "Little Bunny Phoo Phoo, a character in a children's story."

Lyrics 
A bunny rabbit named Little Bunny Foo Foo is harassing a population of field mice by scooping them up and bopping them on their heads. The rabbit is scolded and threatened by a fairy known as the "Good Fairy", who punishes the disobedient rabbit by transforming it into a "goon" or "goonie".

Description 
One of the more popular versions of the song is:

The verses then repeat three more times, with the spoken verse altered to reflect Little Bunny Foo Foo's decreasing number of chances. The alteration appears in the first line of the verse, which changes to "I'll give you two more chances" and "I'll give you one more chance", in the second and third iterations, respectively.

In the fourth and final iteration, when the bunny has run out of chances, the entire spoken verse is altered as follows:

Sometimes "bopping" is replaced with "kissing".

One common ending has Little Bunny Foo Foo turned into a goon, with a pun ending "And the moral of the story is: Hare today, goon tomorrow." This form of story telling with a pun ending is also known as a feghoot.

In popular culture 
In Brazil the song was translated into Portuguese by the Brazilian singer Xuxa for the album Xuxa Só Para Baixinhos 3 ("Xuxa Only for Little Ones"), with the name "Coelhinho Fufu". In it, instead of bopping the field mice on the head, he sharply kisses them and (though not said in the song lyrics) drops them, and the Good Fairy (known literally as the Fairy Godmother) gives him a long lecture, and the penalty for using up his three chances by disobeying is being turned into a duckling.

In Cori Doerrfeld's children's book Little Bunny Foo Foo: The Real Story, a female Little Bunny Foo Foo is portrayed making small cakes. However, rats would constantly come and steal her desserts. This irritates her so much that she chases and pounds the rats in their heads. The fairy, who is unaware of the rats' thievery, however, blames Little Bunny Foo Foo for the pounding, and tells her to stop. The bunny tries to be peaceful but the way the rats still try to steal her delicacies make her want to go physical on them. After three warnings ignored, the fairy transforms Little Bunny Foo Foo into a giant vicious gerbil. The giant gerbil gets revenge by chasing and finally devouring the fairy. The gerbil returns home to enjoy her cakes. The attendees at her party don't seem to mind her appearance.

In Lenore, the Cute Little Dead Girl, Lenore plays as Little Bunny Foo Foo and gets told to stop bopping field mice on the head by the Good Fairy. She continues bopping other animals instead, and so the Good Fairy reappears and reprimands her by saying: "No bopping ANY animals on the head!" Lenore responds by bopping the fairy. The moral of the story was: "Be more specific".

The Moldy Peaches included a version of this song on their only studio album, also called The Moldy Peaches.

This was used in the English dub of Episode 2 of Pop Team Epic in place of the Japanese children's folk song "At a Quiet Lakeside" (しずかな湖畔の).

The My Little Pony: Friendship Is Magic chapter book Fluttershy and the Fine Furry Friends Fair references the poem with a mentioned circus rabbit whose routine involves field mice.

The story was used in the first Barney video, The Backyard Show. In that video, one of the end lines was, "Down came the Good Fairy, and turned Little Bunny Foo Foo into a goon."

The Sesame Street segment Abby's Flying Fairy School, has Abby Cadabby bring Little Bunny Foo Foo to school for B-day, where the students bring something that starts with B.

The poem also provides part of the plot for The 7D episode "Hop to It Dopey!" in which Dopey attempts to halt Foo Foo's attacks on the field mice.

In the South Park episode "Something You Can Do with Your Finger", Butters sings "Little Bunny Foo Foo" to audition for a boy band.

In one children's book, illustrated by Paul Brett Johnson, the bunny picks up muddy pies and splats rats on his wagon. The Good Fairy doesn't like it when it's not polite to go around bopping folks, but the bunny gets a motorcycle and has a lasso in his hand to tie up gophers, and the second time he gets a big tractor to pick up foxes, and the third time he gets a big crawler crane to take down grizzly bears.

In Disney's Silly Songs album, the bunny appears on a pogo-stick and carrying a net while bouncing through a large meadow.

Wee Sing features the character Foo Foo and in place of the field mice, there are the Meecy Mice.

The Wiggles included a version of the song on their Taking Off DVD. "Little Bunny Foo Foo" was played by Captain Feathersword who scooped up the field mice and tickled them on the head.

"Bunny Foo Foo", a 35-foot statue of a leaping rabbit that is named for the poem, is installed at a winery in St. Helena, California.

Parody
A parody version, "The Fúfumal", is Norse-mythology-themed and was composed (in English) by Kate Gladstone, who was, at the time, a member of the Society for Creative Anachronism. It has been since sung by other members.

Bibliography 
Illustrated children's books:

 Little Rabbit Foo Foo by Michael Rosen illustrated by Harold Robins, Walker Books Ltd, 1990, 
 Little Bunny Foo Foo: Told and Sung by the Good Fairy by Paul Brett Johnson, Scholastic Press, 2004, 

Music on CD and cassette:

 "Little Bunny Foo Foo" on Disney's Silly Songs

See also

References

External links 
 

English children's songs
Songs about rabbits and hares
Fiction about shapeshifting
Fairies and sprites in popular culture
Year of song unknown
Songwriter unknown
Fictional rabbits and hares
Mice and rats in popular culture
Forests in fiction